Fahad Abo Jaber (born 21 March 1985) is a Saudi football player who plays as an attacking midfielder.

References

1985 births
Living people
Saudi Arabian footballers
Al-Suqoor FC players
Ittihad FC players
Al-Watani Club players
Ohod Club players
Al Khaldi Club players
Saudi First Division League players
Saudi Professional League players
Saudi Second Division players
Saudi Fourth Division players
Association football midfielders